George Masa (c. 1881 – June 21, 1933), born Masahara Izuka, in Osaka, Japan, was a businessman and professional large-format photographer. He lived and worked in the United States.

Creating a new life in America
Masa arrived in the United States in 1901. In 1915, he settled in Asheville, North Carolina, where he lived the next 18 years until his death.

After initially working for the Grove Park Inn as a bellhop and valet, Masa left the inn to take a position as a photographer in February 1919. Eventually, he founded Plateau Studio (a business he later sold, which is still in operation today). His customers included some of the town's most affluent citizens such as the Vanderbilt, Grove, and Seely families.

The Great Smoky Mountains
Masa came to love the mountains of Western North Carolina and worked tirelessly for their preservation, often at his own expense. Using his photographic equipment and an odometer he crafted from an old bicycle, Masa meticulously catalogued a significant number of peaks, the distances between them, and the names given to them by the local settlers and the Cherokee. He was a friend of Horace Kephart, and the two of them worked together to ensure that a large portion of the Great Smoky Mountains would be established as a national park. Masa also scouted and marked the entire North Carolina portion of the Appalachian Trail.

Death and legacy

Masa died in 1933 from influenza. He had desired to be buried next to his good friend Kephart near Bryson City, North Carolina. However with no surviving family or estate, his burial was organized by his local hiking club, and they did not have the necessary funds to do so. Instead, he was buried in Asheville's Riverside Cemetery.

One year after Masa's death, the Great Smoky Mountains National Park was officially established.

In 1961, Masa Knob, a peak of 5,685 feet in the Great Smoky Mountains National Park, was named in Masa's honor. It stands, appropriately, adjacent to Mount Kephart.

Documentaries
Interest in Masa's life was revived by documentary film-makers more than 60 years after his death. Bonesteel Films released a 90-minute documentary about George Masa in 2003. Also, the fourth episode of Ken Burns's documentary about "The National Parks: America's Best Idea" features George Masa (entitled "Going Home" covering the period between 1920 and 1933), which was initially broadcast on September 30, 2009.

See also
 Issei

Notes

References
 Duncan, Dayton and Ken Burns. (2009). The National Parks: America's Best Idea. New York: Alfred A. Knopf. ; . Two useful biographical vignettes of Masa are William A. Hart's "George Masa: The Best Mountaineer," in Robert S. Brunk (Editor), May We All Remember Well," Volume I, pages 249–75 and Jim Casada, "George Masa: Musings on a Man of Myster," Smoky Mountain Living," Fall, 2001, pages 67–70.

External links
 Ken Burns,  PBS, "The National Parks," – People Behind the National Parks, George Masa
 Paul Bonesteel, Bonesteel Films, "The Mystery of George Masa"

1880s births
1933 deaths
Japanese mountain climbers
Japanese photographers
Japanese geographers
Nature photographers
Pioneers of photography
Great Smoky Mountains National Park
Artists from Asheville, North Carolina
People from Osaka
Japanese emigrants to the United States
20th-century geographers